Juan López, O.P. (died 1632) was a Roman Catholic prelate who served as Bishop of Monopoli (1598–1608) 
and Bishop of Crotone (1595–1598).

Biography
Juan López was ordained a priest in the Order of Preachers.
On 5 June 1595, he was appointed during the papacy of Pope Clement VIII as Bishop of Crotone.
On 11 June 1595, he was consecrated bishop by Alfonso Pisani, Archbishop of Santa Severina with Leonard Abel, Titular Bishop of Sidon, and Cristóbal Senmanat y Robuster, Bishop Emeritus of Orihuela serving as co-consecrators. 
On 15 November 1598, he was appointed during the papacy of Pope Clement VIII as Bishop of Monopoli. 
He served as Bishop of Monopoli until his resignation in 1608. He died in 1632.

While bishop, he was the principal co-consecrator of Alonso González Aguilar, Bishop of León (1613); and Cristóbal Martínez de Salas, Bishop of Panamá (1626).

References

External links and additional sources
 (for Chronology of Bishops) 
 (for Chronology of Bishops) 
 (for Chronology of Bishops) 
 (for Chronology of Bishops) 

Bishops of Monopoli
16th-century Italian Roman Catholic bishops
17th-century Italian Roman Catholic bishops
Bishops appointed by Pope Clement VIII
1632 deaths